Nasson College was a private four-year accredited liberal arts college in Springvale, Maine, USA.

History
The college was founded in 1912 as the Nasson Institute and changed its name twenty-three years later, in 1935. As the Nasson Institute, the college operated as a two-year women's program. It became a four-year college in 1935, becoming co-educational in 1952 and then quickly grew into a well-respected, four-year accredited liberal arts college, reaching a student enrollment of over 900 in the late 1960s. Nasson offered majors in such fields as biology, English, environmental science, government, history, mathematics and medical technology.

On a  campus in the village of Springvale, the campus included a learning resources center housing the library (115,000 volumes and 950 current periodicals), audio-visual services, a science center equipped with a rooftop greenhouse, radiation laboratory and laboratories for the sciences, a gymnasium, little theatre, dining commons, classroom buildings, health clinic and student center. Nasson also had 11 living units ranging from small frame houses to large dormitories. Local benefactors included William and Marion C. Goodall Marland, for whom a dormitory building was named.

The New Division
In 1963, President Roger C. Gay proposed the possibility of having one or more colleges under the control of Nasson College. The planning and preparation began and, in fall 1966, the New Division, an experimental college was established. The aim was to provide a liberal education involving extensive student participation in social, academic and discipline policy and independent study in provinces of knowledge rather than in individual courses. The New Division operated from a separate, newly constructed building located west of the original campus, containing both housing and community facilities.

The realities of operating two substantially different educational models under the same college umbrella resulted in substantial internal conflict at Nasson, primarily voiced by faculty members at the old division. As a result, the New Division's autonomy was rescinded in 1969. Most New Division faculty and students left for other institutions and the program was formally ended the following year. The shake-up also resulted Gay's removal as college president.

Many students arrived in fall 1970 expecting to be joining the New Division, only to find that the college was defunct. Most left Nasson for other colleges.

Closure
Faced with declining enrollment (due to the close of the New Division) and financial pressures, Nasson College eventually closed in 1983. Most of the buildings on the original campus are now being adaptively reused for other purposes. The three buildings located on the west campus (including the New Division building) were obtained in the 1990s by a group hoping to establish a university preparatory school on the site; building renovations were only partially completed, however, and in 2008 the property was put up for sale.

External links
 Nasson College Alumni Association
 The National Memorial, a novel of the effort to establish a charity school at the former New Division of Nasson College

Educational institutions established in 1912
Educational institutions disestablished in 1983
Defunct private universities and colleges in Maine
Universities and colleges in York County, Maine
Sanford, Maine
1912 establishments in Maine
1983 disestablishments in the United States